Bospop is an annual rock festival in Weert, Netherlands. It started off in 1981 as an initiative by the local youth, as an event for local amateur bands. Within a few years, it was able to book renowned Dutch bands like Fatal Flowers, Herman Brood & His Wild Romance and Golden Earring. With the help of Mojo Concerts, it upscaled in the 90s and started to book international artists like John Hiatt and Marillion.

Line-up from 2000 onwards

Gallery

References

External links
 http://www.bospop.nl/

Music festivals in the Netherlands
Rock festivals in the Netherlands
Music in Limburg (Netherlands)
Weert